"Ferry crash" may refer to:

 2003 Staten Island Ferry crash, during which a ferry crashed into a concrete pier.
 Queen of Oak Bay, which drifted into a marina.
 MV Queen of the North, which ran aground.
 Sinking of MV Sewol, which capsized and sank